The region around the city of Braga, in modern Portugal, was an important centre for the spreading of Christendom in the Iberian Peninsula. This is reflected in the number of religious personalities associated with the region and the fact that many ecumenical councils were held in the city.

Historical outline

The tradition that St. Peter of Rates, a disciple of St. James the Great, preached here, is handed down in the ancient Breviary of Braga (Breviarium Bracarense) and in that of Évora; but this, as the Bollandists tell us, is purely traditional.  Saint Ovidius is called the third bishop of the city.  Paternus was certainly bishop of the see about 390.

In its early period the Diocese of Braga produced the famous writer Paulus Orosius (fl. 418). At the beginning of the eighteenth century a contest was waged over the birthplace of Orosius, some claiming him for Braga and others for Tarragona. The Marquis of Mondejar, with all the evidence in his favour, supported the claim of Braga; Dalmas, the chronicler of Catalonia, that of Tarragona.
 
Avitus of Braga, a contemporary writer of lesser importance, was a priest who went to the East to consult with St. Augustine at the same time that Orosius, who had been sent by St. Augustine, returned from consulting St. Jerome. It was through Avitus that the priest, Lucian of Caphar Gamala near Jerusalem, made known to the West the discovery of the body of St. Stephen (December, 415). The Greek encyclical letter of Lucian was translated into Latin by Avitus and sent to Braga with another for the bishop, Balconius, his clergy, and people, together with a relic of St. Stephen. Avitus also attended the Council of Jerusalem against Pelagius (415). Two others of the name Avitus, men of note, wrought harm by introducing into these provinces the doctrines of Origen and Victorinus. 

Some have denied that Braga was a metropolitan see; others have attempted without sufficient evidence, however, to claim two metropolitan sees for Gallaecia before the sixth century. In fact after the destruction of Astorga (433) by the Visigoths, Braga was elevated to the dignity of a metropolitan see in the time of St. Leo I (440-461). Balconius was then its bishop and Agrestius, Bishop of Lugo, was the metropolitan. At the latter's death the right of metropolitan rank was restored to the oldest bishop of the province, who was the bishop of Braga. From this time, until the Muslim conquest of Hispania (711), he retained the supremacy over all the sees of the province.
 
In 1110 Pope Paschal II restored Braga to its former metropolitan rank. When Portugal separated from León in 1139, Braga assumed even greater importance. It contested with Toledo the primacy over all the Iberian sees, but the popes decided in favour of the latter city. Since it retained as suffragans the dioceses of Porto, Coimbra, Viseu, Bragança-Miranda do Douro, Aveiro and Pinhel. In 1390 Braga was divided to make the Archdiocese of Lisbon, and in 1540 its territory was again divided to create the Archdiocese of Évora.
 
There have been many very famous bishops and writers in this diocese. Among its earlier bishops, besides the traditional St. Peter already mentioned, the most famous is St. Martin of Braga who died in 580, noted for his wisdom and holiness. St. Gregory of Tours says of him (Hist. France, V, xxxvii) that he was born in Pannonia, visited the Holy Land, and became the foremost scholar of his time. St. Isidore of Seville ("De Viris illustribus", c. xxxv) tells us that he "was abbot of the monastery of Dumio near Braga, came to Gallaecia from the East, converted the Suevic inhabitants from the heresy of Arianism, taught them Catholic doctrine and discipline, strengthened their ecclesiastical organization , and founded monasteries. He also left a number of letters in which he recommended a reform of manners, a life of faith and prayer, and giving of alms, the constant practice of all virtues and the love of God." For his writings, see Otto Bardenhewer, Patrologie (2nd ed., 1901), 579-581.
 
Braga having been destroyed by the Saracens, and restored in 1071, a succession of illustrious bishops occupied the see. Among these were Mauricio Burdinho (1111–14), sent as legate to the Emperor Henry V (1118), and by him created antipope with the title of Gregory VIII; Pedro Juliano, Archdeacon of Lisbon, elected Bishop of Braga in 1274, created cardinal by Gregory X in 1276, and finally elected pope under the name of John XXI; Saint Bartholomew a Martyribus (1559–67), a Dominican, who in 1566, together with Father Luis de Sotomayor, Francisco Foreiro, and others, assisted at the Council of Trent; de Castro, an Augustinian (1589–1609), who consecrated the cathedral, 28 July 1592.
 
Aleixo de Meneses, also an Augustinian, was transferred to Braga from the archiepiscopal see of Goa. He had been an apostle to the Nestorians of the Malabar Coast in Farther India and had converted them to Catholicism with the help of missionaries of the various religious orders. Under him was held the Council of Diamper (1599), for the establishment of the Church on the Malabar Coast. He died at Madrid in 1617 in his fifty-eighth year in the odour of sanctity, being then President of the Council of Castile.
 
Three other bishops of note were Roderico de Cunha (1627–35), historian of the Church in Portugal; Roderico de Moura (1704–28), who restored the cathedral, and Cayetano Brandão, who was reputed a saint among the faithful.

Church Councils of Braga

Many church councils were held in Braga, some of them important. The authenticity of the so-called council of 411 is very doubtful. It was probably invented by Father Bernardo Brito.

First Council of Braga
In the council of 563 eight bishops took part, and twenty-two decrees were promulgated, among others the following: that in the services of the church the same rite should be followed by all, and that on vigils and in solemn Masses the same lessons should be said by all; that bishops and priests should salute the people with Dominus vobiscum, as in the Book of Ruth, the response being Et cum spiritu tuo, as was the custom in the East, without the alterations introduced by the Priscillianists; that Mass should be said according to the ordo sent from Rome to Profuturus; that the form used for baptism in the Metropolitan see of Braga should not be altered; that bishops should take rank after the metropolitan according to the date of their consecration; that bishops should not ordain candidates from other dioceses without dimissorial letters from their bishop; that nothing should be sung in the church but the Psalms and parts of the Old and New Testament; that all priests who abstained from eating meat should be obliged to eat vegetables cooked in meat, to avoid all suspicion of the taint of Priscillianism, and that if they refused they should be excommunicated; that suicides and catechumens should not be buried with great ceremony, nor should anyone be buried inside the church; that priests should be appointed for the blessing of the chrism.

Second Council of Braga
The second council held in 572, presided over by the aforesaid St. Martin, was held to increase the number of bishops in Gallaecia. Twelve bishops assisted at this council, and ten decrees were promulgated: (1) that the bishops should in their visitations see in what manner the priests celebrated the Holy Sacrifice and administered baptism and the other sacraments, thanking God if they found everything as it should be, and instructing the priests if they were found wanting in knowledge, and obliging all catechumens to attend instructions for twenty days before baptism and to learn the creed; (2) that the bishop must not be tyrannical towards his priests; (3-4) that no fee must be accepted for Holy orders, and the holy chrism must be distributed free; (5-6) that the bishop must not ask a fee for consecrating a church, that no church should be consecrated without the bishop being sure of the endowment of the ministers, and that no church built on private property for the purpose of emolument should receive consecration; (8) that if a cleric should accuse any one of unchastity without the evidence of two or three witnesses he should be excommunicated; (9) that the metropolitan should announce the date of Easter, and have it made known to the people after Christmas, so that they might be prepared for the beginning of Lent, when litanies were to be recited for three days; on the third day the Lenten fast should be announced after the Mass; (10) that any one saying Mass without fasting, as many did, as a result of Priscillianist tendencies, should be deprived of his office. This council was attended by the bishops of the suffragan sees of Braga, and by those of the Diocese of Lugo, and Pope Innocent III removed all doubt as to its authenticity.

Third Council of Braga
The Third Council of Braga was held in 675, during the primacy of Leodegisius, and in the reign of King Wamba. Eight decrees were promulgated at this council; (1) that no one should dare to offer in sacrifice milk and grapes, but bread and wine mixed with a drop of water in a chalice, nor should bread soaking in wine be used; (2) that laymen should be excommunicated, and ecclesiastics deprived of their office, if either put the sacred vessels to profane uses; (4) that no priest should have any woman but his mother in his house; (5-6) that bishops, when carrying the relics of martyrs in procession, must walk to the church, and not be carried in a chair, or litter, by deacons clothed in white; that corporal punishment was not to be inflicted on youthful ecclesiastics, abbots, or priests, except for grievous faults; (7-8) that no fee must be accepted for Holy orders, and that the rectors of the churches must not require that members of their ecclesiastical household to do work on their private farms; if they did so they must recompense the church for the injury done thereby.

Other councils
There were other councils at Braga in 1278-1280, 1301, 1328, 1436, 1488, 1537, besides various diocesan and provincial synods of lesser importance.

Sources and external links

History of Catholicism in Portugal
History of Braga